

Winners

Winners and nominations
2007 Nayanthara - Billa
Asin - Pokkiri
Shriya Saran - Sivaji: The Boss
Jyothika - Mozhi
Trisha - Kireedam
2008 Nayanthara - Yaaradi Nee Mohini
Asin - Dasavathaaram
Genelia D'Souza - Santosh Subramaniam
Sneha - Pirivom Santhippom
Trisha - Abhiyum Naanum
2009 Anushka Shetty - Vettaikaaran
Nayanthara - Aadhavan
Shriya Saran - Kanthaswamy
Tamannaah - Ayan
Trisha - Sarvam
2010 Trisha - Vinnaithaandi Varuvaayaa
Aishwarya Rai - Enthiran
Anushka Shetty - Singam
Nayanthara - Boss Engira Bhaskaran
Tamannaah - Paiyaa
2011 Anushka Shetty - Deiva Thirumagal
Asin - Kaavalan
Hansika Motwani - Engeyum Kadhal
Taapsee Pannu - Aadukalam
Trisha - Mankatha
2012 Kajal Aggarwal - Thuppakki
Shruti Haasan - 3
Anushka Shetty - Thaandavam
Hansika Motwani - Oru Kal Oru Kannadi
Ileana D'Cruz - Nanban
Samantha Ruth Prabhu - Neethane En Ponvasantham
2013 Nayanthara - Raja Rani
Amala Paul - Thalaiva
Anushka Shetty - Singam 2
Hansika Motwani - Theeya Velai Seiyyanum Kumaru
Trisha - Endrendrum Punnagai
2014 Hansika Motwani - Maan Karate
 Nayanthara - Idhu Kathirvelan Kadhal
Sri Divya -  Jeeva
Samantha Ruth Prabhu - Kaththi
Shruti Haasan - Poojai
2017 Nayanthara - Aramm
 Anushka Shetty - Baahubali 2: The Conclusion
Kajal Aggarwal -  Vivegam
Keerthy Suresh - Bairavaa
Samantha Akkineni - Mersal

See also
 Tamil cinema
 Cinema of India

References

Favorite Heroine